Chiayi Bus Rapid Transit (Chiayi BRT) is a limited-stop express bus service operating in Taiwan, linking Chiayi High Speed Rail Station in Taibao City, Chiayi County and downtown Chiayi City. It uses exclusive bus lanes and GPS-controlled traffic lights to aid a speedy transfer between stations.

See also
 Taichung BRT
 Transportation in Taiwan

References

Bus transportation in Taiwan
Transportation in Chiayi